Suprabhatham is a 1974 Indian Malayalam-language film, directed by M. Krishnan Nair and produced by A. L. Sreenivasan. The film stars Prem Nazir, Adoor Bhasi, Thikkurissy Sukumaran Nair and T. S. Muthaiah. The film has musical score by G. Devarajan.

Cast
Prem Nazir
Adoor Bhasi
Thikkurissy Sukumaran Nair
T. S. Muthaiah
Sadhana
Sudheer
Ushakumari
Vincent
Manjula

Soundtrack
The music was composed by G. Devarajan and the lyrics were written by Vayalar Ramavarma.

References

External links
 

1974 films
1970s Malayalam-language films
Films directed by M. Krishnan Nair